The 2010 season for  began in January with the Tour Down Under and ended in October at the Giro di Lombardia. As a UCI ProTour team, they were automatically invited and obliged to send a squad to every event in the ProTour. The team's general manager was Bob Stapleton, in his third year with the team.

With the team's focus shifting to full-time support of prolific sprinter Mark Cavendish, many riders left the team after the 2009 season, most for the new . Several young riders, most of them in their first year at this level of the sport, joined the team to be members of Cavendish's new leadout train, which lacked Cavendish's primary leadout man from 2009, Mark Renshaw, for the first several months of the season due to Epstein-Barr virus. Cavendish's own training and development were also stunted because of a dental infection.

2010 roster
Ages as of January 1, 2010.

Riders who joined the team for the 2010 season

Riders who left the team during or after the 2009 season

One-day races
Greipel scored the team's first one-day victory in February, before the spring season and the races known as 'classics' were held. Greipel was first over the line in the Trofeo Magaluf-Palmanovoa, a part of the Vuelta a Mallorca quasi-stage race, and expressed surprise at his victory on such a hilly course when asked after the race.

Spring classics

Fall races

Stage races
The team attended the Tour Down Under, with a squad headed by André Greipel. Though Greipel did not wish to be considered a favorite for victory in the event, he went on to win the event's general and points classifications, and three of the six stages. The team next took wins at two partially concurrent events in February, the inaugural Tour of Oman and the Volta ao Algarve. Howard's win in stage 4 in Oman was his first as a professional, while Greipel's successful early season continued in Portugal with wins in stage 2 and the points classification. Later in the month, Rogers won the Ruta Del Sol without winning a stage. It was his first overall stage race victory since 2003.

Grand Tours

Giro d'Italia
Team HTC-Columbia came to the Giro with a squad led by Greipel, the season's most prolific winner of individual days of racing and a heavy favorite in the Giro's flat stages, and Pinotti, who would try for a high overall placing and stage wins in the time trials. Pinotti was tenth in the stage 1 time trial in Amsterdam. Goss and Greipel both made all the splits occurring after many crashes marred stage 2. In the depleted sprint finish, the Australian took second despite entering the Giro prepared to be Greipel's leadout man. Greipel was fourth and did not seriously challenge stage winner Tyler Farrar. More crashes occurred in stage 3. Greipel again made all the selections, but again was not a factor in the sprint, taking just sixth on the day. The squad's best-placed rider prior the transfer to Italy was Sieberg in fifth, 7 seconds behind the race leader. With the squad noted as one of the favorites in the stage 4 team time trial, Sieberg, as well as Goss and Greipel both three seconds back of him, all had a realistic chance of taking the pink jersey. The squad finished the  course with five riders together in 36'58". Goss and Greipel were among the five finishing together, but their 21-second gap to stage winners  meant that the team missed out on getting the pink jersey.

Stage 7 was difficult, long and run partially on unpaved roads. The day on which the stage was run happened to have very heavy rain, making the course muddy and still more treacherous. Pinotti rode with the leaders most of the day, following a move by Alexander Vinokourov after overnight race leader Vincenzo Nibali needed a bike change. Pinotti was not quite able to bridge up to the leading trio of Vinokourov, Damiano Cunego, and stage winner Cadel Evans in the final kilometer, finishing six seconds back for fourth on the day. The result moved him into sixth in the overall standings. The ninth stage was very flat, without any categorized hills.  forced a grueling pace in the final kilometers, which led to a split in the field – only 47 riders finished together at the head of the field. Greipel had difficulties keeping the pace and was just 19th on the day. The next day's stage was also flat, and Greipel again had troubles in the sprint, coming only seventh out of the nine riders who finished three seconds ahead of the rest of the peloton. In stage 11, when more than 50 riders formed the day's breakaway group, Goss was the only HTC-Columbia rider to make the selection. He did not come close to staying with the leaders, however, finishing just three seconds ahead of the peloton and with them nearly 13 minutes behind the stage winner. These results moved Pinotti out of the top ten overall. Pinotti took seventh in stage 12, when a late ten-man selection of General Classification favorites and hopefuls finished ten seconds ahead of the peloton. Lewis made a winning breakaway in stage 13. He attacked in the final kilometer and appeared poised for a stage win, but Manuel Belletti passed him up  from the finish line.

Greipel would normally have pulled out of the race well before its most difficult mountain stages took place, but having missed out on the sprints in the race's first two weeks, he rode through the high mountain stages 14 and 15 (which Pinotti finished among the top ten in both) and the Plan de Corones time trial with stage 18 in mind. Very short and very flat, the stage was ideal for Greipel. The team rode a tempo at the head of the peloton to keep the day's breakaway in check, and caught them in the stage's final few kilometers. Getting an effective leadout from Sieberg and Raboň, Greipel at last took a Giro stage win.

In stage 19, which went over the Passo del Mortirolo, Pinotti returned to the top ten overall by finishing tenth on the day. Pinotti very nearly won the time trial which closed out the Giro. He posted a better split at the intermediate time check than provisional best and eventual stage winner Gustav Larsson, but faded in the final kilometers to finish two seconds back, for second. The result did, however, move him from tenth overall up to ninth, at a deficit of 14'20" to Giro champion Ivan Basso. The squad finished 16th in the Trofeo Fast Team standings but did much better in the Trofeo Super Team, coming in second in that classification.

Tour de France
The team's squad for the Tour de France was largely centered around Cavendish and the goal of having him win the green jersey. This was in spite of the fact that the Manxman's season to date had been subpar, with only three victories before the Tour (in 2009 he had 13 wins before the Tour). Rogers, coming off overall wins in the Tour of California and the Ruta Del Sol, was the squad's General Classification hopeful.

Martin was one of the earliest starters in the prologue time trial, and was the leader for most of the day with a time of ten minutes and ten seconds. Fabian Cancellara was one of the day's last starters and was the only rider to beat Martin's time, leaving the young German second on the day. The first road race stage in Belgium featured many crashes, including one very near the finish line that greatly reduced the number of riders in position to sprint for victory. Renshaw avoided the pileups, but missed out on the stage win to Alessandro Petacchi. Cavendish finished with the second group on the road, not crossing the line until two and a half minutes after Petacchi. The squad was one of the fortunate few to emerge from the crash-ridden second stage without any injuries. The fourth stage was again flat and more straightforward this time, as there were no serious crashes on the day. Cavendish, however, continued to struggle, coming home a distant twelfth in the field sprint. Finally, in stage 5, Cavendish took his first win of the Tour, and appeared very emotional on the podium when accepting the day's honors. He added another sprint win the next day in stage 6. Stage 8 was the last before the Tour's first day, ending at Morzine-Avoriaz in the Alps, a stage sure to help define the race's overall classification. Rogers finished twelfth on the day and 20 seconds behind the first group on the road, but gaining time against some contenders such as Joaquim Rodríguez and Andreas Klöden. However, the high mountain stage 9, incorporating the Col de la Madeleine, Rogers lost four minutes to the stage winner and two minutes to the majority of the race's elite riders, falling to 14th. He continued to fall in the standings further from that point on, eventually finishing the race in 37th place.

Cavendish's success in the flats continued, however, as he won stage 11 with a sizeable lead over Petacchi and Tyler Farrar. The stage was notable for events which took place during that sprint. Farrar's leadout man Julian Dean and Cavendish's leadout man Renshaw clashed for position at the head of the peloton in the stage's final meters. As Dean led Farrar up the middle of the road with Renshaw to his left, the Aussie responded by head-butting him. Renshaw later stated that he was trying to keep Dean from maneuvering him into the roadside barricades, with safety as much a concern as victory, and Dean's line did deviate slightly as he rode. Amid the chaos, the three principal sprinters jumped for an unusually long final kick to the line, starting  out. Race officials later expelled Renshaw from the Tour for the headbutting. Dean was not punished for the incident, though the possibility for penalty existed – Cavendish himself was assessed a penalty in the 2009 Tour de France for similar irregular sprinting. In stage 13 two days later, a field sprint seemed to be shaping up until Alexander Vinokourov slipped away for a solo win by a margin of 13 seconds. Cavendish indeed led the peloton across the finish line, but it was only for second place. Cavendish won the Tour's last two road race stages, stage 18 in Bordeaux and on the Champs-Élysées for the second year in a row, a Tour first. His five wins in the 2010 Tour gave him 15 for his career, the most ever for a sprinter despite only having ridden four Tours. His poor performances early in the Tour, however, meant he again fell just short of claiming the green jersey, losing out to Petacchi by 11 points. The squad finished 17th in the teams classification.

Vuelta a España

Season victories

Footnotes

References

HTC–Highroad
2010 road cycling season by team
2010 in American sports